Interview (1971) was a Bengali film directed by noted Indian art film director Mrinal Sen. A path-breaking film in terms of the narrative innovation and cinematic technique, it was a commercial success and went to run for six weeks amidst gushing admiration and accolades, when it was screened first. It also happened to be the debut film of Ranjit Mallick. Although it was a film on the colonial hangover, it touched upon the diverse issue of anti-establishment, middle class cowardice, and unemployment.

This film is considered to be the first film of Mrinal Sen's Calcutta trilogy, the others being Calcutta 71, and Padatik.

Plot
Ranjit Mallick is a smart personable young man. A friend of the family, who works in a foreign firm, has assured him of a lucrative job in his firm. All Ranjit has to do is to appear in an interview, dressed in a western style suit.

It seems a simple task, but fate decides otherwise. A strike by a labour union means that he can't get his suit back from the laundry. His father's old suit won't fit him. He borrows a suit, but loses it in a fracas. Ultimately he has to go to the interview dressed in the traditional Bengali dhoti and kurta.

Cast
 Ranjit Mallick as Ranjit
 Karuna Banerjee as Ranjit's Mother 
 Shekhar Chatterjee as Shekhar Uncle, a family friend 
 Bulbul Mukherjee as Ranjit's elder sister 
 Mamata chatterjee as Ranjit's girlfriend

References

External links
 
 On the Mrinal Sen website
 Review at Upperstall

1971 films
1970 drama films
1970 films
Bengali-language Indian films
Indian drama films
Films directed by Mrinal Sen
Films set in Kolkata
1970s Bengali-language films
1971 drama films